Captain Haly Heron (c. 1550–1591), was an English author and soldier during the Elizabethan era.

Biography
Haly matriculated as a sizar at Queens' College, Cambridge in November 1565 and completed his Bachelor of Arts in 1570. For the benefit of a pupil, John Kaye the younger, he wrote ‘A new Discourse of Morall Philosophie entituled the Kayes of Counsaile, not so pleasant as profitable for younge Courtiours,’ London, 1579. Shortly after the publication of the book, Haly entered the service of Sir Nicholas Malby in Connaught, Ireland. In December 1585 Thomas Randolph, at the instigation of his wife, who was related to Heron, gave him very unwillingly a note of introduction to Sir Francis Walsingham. In 1586, he served in the Low Countries during the Anglo-Spanish War and he was made a Captain in 1590. He was killed in May 1591, when leading an assault on a town in Brittany.

References 

1550s births
1591 deaths
People of the Elizabethan era
English essayists
English people of the Anglo-Spanish War (1585–1604)
Alumni of Queens' College, Cambridge
16th-century English poets
Kingdom of England people in the Kingdom of Ireland